Carolingian architecture is the style of north European Pre-Romanesque architecture belonging to the period of the Carolingian Renaissance of the late 8th and 9th centuries, when the Carolingian dynasty dominated west European politics. It was a conscious attempt to emulate Roman architecture and to that end it borrowed heavily from Early Christian and Byzantine architecture, though there are nonetheless innovations of its own, resulting in a unique character.

The gatehouse of the monastery at Lorsch, built around 800, exemplifies classical inspiration for Carolingian architecture, built as a triple-arched hall dominating the gateway, with the arched facade interspersed with attached classical columns and pilasters above.

The Palatine Chapel in Aachen constructed between 792–805 was inspired by the octagonal Justinian church of San Vitale in Ravenna, built in the 6th century, but at Aachen there is a tall monumental western entrance complex, as a whole called a westwork—a Carolingian innovation.

Carolingian churches generally are basilican, like the Early Christian churches of Rome, and commonly incorporated westworks, which is arguably the precedent for the western facades of later medieval cathedrals. An original westwork survives today at the Abbey of Corvey, built in 885.

Carolingian architecture 

The Carolingian Renaissance generated such a construction boom that between 768 and 855, 27 new cathedrals, 417 monastic buildings and 100 royal residences were built. Just during Charlemagne's reign, 16 cathedrals, 232 monasteries and 65 palaces were built. The kings were not only responsible for the construction sites but they also provided the architects and the funding. The rediscovery of the architecture treatises written by Vitruvius enabled the building in stone, a material little used until then North of the Loire Valley. During their travels to Italy, the Carolingians discovered the Roman basilicas, the triumphal arches and the palatine chapels.  The architects did not simply copy the Roman forms but rather adapted their plans to serve the needs of the royal and religious ceremonies. Most of the architectural elements invented at the beginning of the Carolingian period were refined over decades and successively adapted to eventually lead to the Romanesque architecture of the 11th century.

The archaeological evidence indicates that in addition to religious architecture there did once exist an abundance of secular buildings most of which are no longer visible having been razed to the ground and any occasional vestiges only being evident from the air by means of outline shadows. Many have been incorporated into subsequent buildings. This can be attributed to the fact that secular building in stone (such as castles) was not introduced until the following centuries. Only in the case of Carolingian palaces has archaeology made a serious attempt to recover the foundations and attempted scientific reconstructions.  

The first period of the Carolingian architecture, during the reign of Pepin the Short and the beginning of Charlemagne's reign, was driven by powerful ecclesiastic figures such as bishop Chrodegang of Metz, Fulrad, abbot of Saint-Denis, and Manassès, abbot of Flavigny Abbey. 

The pope wanted to reorganise and standardise the Catholic Church with the help of Charlemagne. Bishop Chrodegang introduced the Roman liturgical services which resulted in important changes in the architecture. The orientation of the churches was defined so that the altar would be located at the eastern end while the entrance would be at the western end. The St. Peter's Basilica in Rome, the Church of the Holy Sepulchre in Jerusalem and the early Christian art and architecture became the main references for the Carolingian designers.

During the years 780–790, the creation of the Lorsch Abbey, the expansion of the Princely Abbey of Corvey, and the foundation of the abbeys of Saint-Riquier and Fulda announced a new significance. The Palace of Aachen with its chapel was the jewel and the culmination of this period.

Towards the end of Charlemange's reign the architecture projects multiplied, some very ambitious, as well as the integration of the liturgical services and the codification of the monastic architecture. The Plan of Saint Gall, with its extensive and detailed instructions, is an important example of how the architectural elements of a Christian monastery were defined during this period to establish a classic style.

The decline of the Carolingians started during the 10th century and culminated in 1000–1020, when the Carolingian institutions collapsed in France while in Germany the new Ottonian dynasty developed the Ottonian architecture, which borrowed numerous elements from the Carolingian architecture. A fine example of this is the Eglise Saint-Pierre-et-Saint-Paul d'Ottmarsheim in Alsace, founded around 1030.

Notable examples

 Lorsch Abbey, gateway (c. 800)
 Benedictine Convent of Saint John, Müstair (c. 800)
 Palatine Chapel, Aachen (792–805)
 Oratory in Germigny-des-Prés (806)
 Imperial Palace, Ingelheim (completed after 814)
 Abbey in Saint-Philbert-de-Grand-Lieu (815)
 Lobbes Abbey, Belgium (819–823)
 St. Michael, Fulda, rotunda and crypt (822)
 Einhard's Basilica, Steinbach (827)
 Saint Justinus' church, Frankfurt-Höchst (830)
 Broich Castle, Muelheim an der Ruhr (884)
 Abbey of Corvey (885)
 St. George, Oberzell in Reichenau Island (888)

Notable Carolingian architects
 Odo of Metz, architect of Charlemagne's Palace of Aachen with the Palatine Chapel
 Ratgar of fulda

See also

 Carolingian art
 Carolingian Empire
 Carolingian church

References

Conant, K. J. (1978) Carolingian and Romanesque Architecture, 800–1200
Pevsner, N. (1963) An Outline of European Architecture

Gallery 

 
8th-century architecture
9th-century architecture
Architectural history
Architectural styles
Medieval architecture